Cyrtolabulus is an African, Indomalayan and Palearctic genus of potter wasps. It contains the following species:

 Cyrtolabulus angustatus Gusenleitner, 2004
 Cyrtolabulus arcuatus (Giordani Soika, 1944)
 Cyrtolabulus bekilyensis (Giordani Soika, 1941)
 Cyrtolabulus bimaculatus Gusenleitner, 2000
 Cyrtolabulus caputabnormis Gusenleitner, 2000
 Cyrtolabulus carbonarius Giordani Soika, 1989
 Cyrtolabulus chudeaui (R. du Buysson, 1908)
 Cyrtolabulus concavus Giordani Soika, 1983
 Cyrtolabulus conspicuus Gusenleitner, 1999 
 Cyrtolabulus elbanus Giordani Soika, 1977
 Cyrtolabulus eremicus (Giordani Soika, 1952)
 Cyrtolabulus exiguus (Saussure, 1852)
 Cyrtolabulus finitimus (Kohl, 1907)
 Cyrtolabulus garambensis (Bequaert, 1918)
 Cyrtolabulus gracilis (Kohl, 1906) 
 Cyrtolabulus grossepunctatus (Kirby, 1900)
 Cyrtolabulus interstitialis (Cameron, 1902) 
 Cyrtolabulus iranus (Giordani Soika, 1968)
 Cyrtolabulus madli Gusenleitner, 1998
 Cyrtolabulus mauretanicus Gusenleitner, 2006
 Cyrtolabulus metatarsalis Gusenleitner, 1998
 Cyrtolabulus minoicus Gusenleitner, 2003 
 Cyrtolabulus mochii (Giordani Soika, 1968)
 Cyrtolabulus nigerrimus Gusenleitner, 2002
 Cyrtolabulus occidentalis (Giordani Soika, 1968)
 Cyrtolabulus pedunculatus (E. Saunders, 1905)
 Cyrtolabulus punctatus (Meade-Waldo, 1910)
 Cyrtolabulus rauschi Gusenleitner, 1999 
 Cyrtolabulus reichli Gusenleitner, 1998
 Cyrtolabulus rhodesiensis (Giordani Soika, 1944) 
 Cyrtolabulus rhombicus Gusenleitner, 2004 
 Cyrtolabulus saharensis (Giordani Soika, 1952) 
 Cyrtolabulus sexspinosus Giordani Soika, 1977
 Cyrtolabulus socotrae (Kohl, 1906) 
 Cyrtolabulus soikai Gusenleitner, 1999 
 Cyrtolabulus sollicitus (Giordani Soika, 1941)
 Cyrtolabulus spinithorax (Giordani Soika, 1968) 
 Cyrtolabulus striaticlypeus Gusenleitner, 2002
 Cyrtolabulus suavis (Vecht, 1963) 
 Cyrtolabulus subobscurus (Giordani Soika, 1941) 
 Cyrtolabulus syriacus (Giordani Soika, 1968) 
 Cyrtolabulus transversus Giordani Soika, 1987 
 Cyrtolabulus tussaci Giordani Soika, 1989
 Cyrtolabulus ulricae Gusenleitner, 1999
 Cyrtolabulus yunnanensis Lee, 1982 
 Cyrtolabulus zarudnyi (Kostylev, 1939) 
 Cyrtolabulus zavattari (Giordani Soika, 1939) 
 Cyrtolabulus zethiformis (Giordani Soika, 1958)

References

Biological pest control wasps
Potter wasps